The Anaerobic Digestion and Bioresources Association (ADBA), formerly the Anaerobic Digestion and Biogas Association, is a United Kingdom-based trade association for the anaerobic digestion and associated industries.

ADBA was founded in September 2009 by its then chairman Lord Redesdale and 10 founder member companies to represent businesses involved in the anaerobic digestion and biogas industries. Its objective is to help remove the barriers to anaerobic digestion that are faced and to support its members to grow their businesses. Its principal aim is to enable and facilitate the development of a mature anaerobic digestion industry in the UK within 10 years.

Recognising there was no industry group that exclusively represented the emerging anaerobic digestion industry in the UK (previously the Renewable Energy Association and the Association for Organics Recycling had break out groups related to anaerobic digestion) ADBA was formed by a number of UK-based companies which specialise in anaerobic digestion technologies including, Clarke Energy, Entec, Kirk Environmental and Monsal.

During its relatively short time in existence, ADBA has made a number of significant contributions to the development of legislation including promoting higher levels of feed-in tariffs for digestion plants and a biomethane carbon credit trading platform. It now represents over 370 member companies.

On 1 October 2014, the ADBA announced that it was changing its name with immediate effect to the Anaerobic Digestion & Bioresources Association, "in response to a rapidly changing political and economic landscape."

References

External links
 Anaerobic Digestion and Bioresources Association website

Anaerobic digestion
Bioenergy in the United Kingdom
Bioenergy organizations
Professional associations based in the United Kingdom